Cevat Rıfat Atilhan (1892, Constantinople – 4 February 1967, Istanbul) was a Turkish career officer and antisemitic writer, who was one of the initiators of the 1934 Thrace pogroms.

Biography
He was born in 1892 in Vefa, Constantinople. His father Rifat Pasha was the Governor of Damascus. The first years of his childhood passed in Damascus. Then he came to Constantinople and went to Fatih İptidaisi (primary school). After graduating from primary school, he started to Kuleli Military High School, preferring to military service. In his first days in the lieutenant years he took part in the Albanian campaign. He was taken prisoner by the Bulgarians in the siege of Edirne. Bondage lasted two years.

At the beginning of World War I, he was ordered by Cemal Pasha from Mersin. He came forward with his heroism in the Sinai and Palestinian fronts.

Upon the conclusion of the First World War, Cemal Pasha from Mersin came to Konya. The establishment of the National Front had great benefits. He met with Sultan Mehmed VI as the first national representative. When Sultan Mehmed VI left his post, Damat Ferid Pasha had Atilhan arrested because of a conspiracy. He was imprisoned in the Bekir Ağa Bölgesi.

During the Turkish War of Independence, he was appointed as the commander of the Zonguldak-Bartin and Havalisi Fronts. It prevented the spread of the French Army in this region. Upon the victory of the War of Independence, he left the army and went into writing.

Of his anti-semitic book "Suzy Liberman, Jewish Spy", in 1935 the Turkish Army gave the order to buy 40`000 copies and distributed them amongst the officers. The book is banned on September 17, 1936

In 1942, he was arrested by the government of the time on the grounds that the coup was being prepared. He was incarcerated for 11 months before being released by the results of an investigation led by Fevzi Çakmak.

During the one-party period of Turkey, Atilhan who was close to the ideas of Turkism, contributed writings to two of the most influential magazines of Islamic politics in early Turkey; Sebilürreşad and Büyük Doğu. His writings and his political activities affected growing Islamic movements in Turkey. He was one of the founders of Millî Kalkınma Partisi in 1945 and İslam Democratic Party in 1951. He was arrested in 1952 along with Necip Fazıl Kısakürek in Malatya as responsible for the assassination attempt of Ahmet Emin Yalman. He was detained for 11 months and 15 days.

He wrote 74 works and thousands of articles. He was influenced by antisemitic politicians like Şerif Yaçağaz and Ali Galip Yenen. Because of his antisemitic writings, he was described as the 'Hitler of the Middle East'.

In August 1964 he was invited to congress of Islamic States in Somalia. He was elected as the Chairman of the executive committee of the Congress. This post was his last major mission.

He died of a heart attack on 4 February 1967.

References 

1892 births
1967 deaths
Writers from Istanbul
Ottoman people of World War I
Turkish people of the Turkish War of Independence
Antisemitism in Turkey